Curepipe also known as La Ville-Lumière (The City of Light), is a town in Mauritius, located in the Plaines Wilhems District, the eastern part also lies in the Moka District. The town is administered by the Municipal Council of Curepipe. Curepipe lies at a higher elevation, often referred to as the "Central Plateau". According to the census made by Statistics Mauritius in 2018, the population of the town was at 78,618.

Etymology
The town's name, Curepipe, is said to be originated from the French curer sa pipe, which translates to "cleaning his/her pipe". There are several theories by historians as to the naming of the city. Some historians believe that the name was given as travellers and soldiers from the 19th century often travelled from Port Louis and Grand Port (now Mahébourg) to refill their pipes in Curepipe. Other historians believe that the name was given after a late landowner during the 18th century.

Geography
It is located in the Plaine Wilhems district on the central plateau of Mauritius at an altitude of 561 meters. Of the larger towns of the island's central plateau, Curepipe is the most southern and also the highest. As a consequence of its height, Curepipe is known for its relatively cooler and rainier climate. The dormant volcano Trou aux Cerfs is nearby.

Politics

Curepipe is managed by a council, which is democratically elected by its citizens. The council is headed by the Mayor and is principally responsible for local policy making. The current Mayor is Mr. Hans Berty Margueritte. The town's administration on the other hand is responsible for the implementation of these policies as well as the day-to-day management of the council's activities. The current administrative head is Mrs Jugroop

Curepipe's historic town hall was actually originally situated in Moka, and the whole building was moved to Curepipe in 1903.

For the general elections the town is classified as the No 17 constituency known as Curepipe and Midlands.

Demographics 

According to the census made by Statistics Mauritius in 2018, the population of the town was at 78,692. The primary spoken language is Mauritian Creole, though French predominates in more formal situations. Tamil, Bhojpuri, Hindi, Telugu, Urdu, Mandarin and Hakka Chinese are also spoken as second or third language mostly in religious activities. The council's official language is English.

Religion 

According to the 2012 census conducted by Statistics Mauritius, Christianity is the most prevalently practised religion in Curepipe (48.4%) (Catholic 39.2%, Protestant 1.3%, Other Christian 8%), followed by Hinduism (37.7%) and Islam (13.9%).

Economic activities
The town hosts several textile factories, a diamond processing industry and a range of jewelry businesses. In addition, handicraft shops, restaurants and shopping centres add to the commercial mix of the town. The relatively affluent suburbs are also home to a great deal of business activity.

Sustainable development
The town council is acutely aware of the need to bring principles of sustainability into the town's economic development. Prominent projects include the segregation of waste, judicious use of water, parking problems, the encouraging of public transport, the promotion of the SSR Curepipe Botanic Gardens and working towards minimizing the town's carbon footprint. In 2011 the town joined ICLEI - Local Governments for Sustainability.

Recently, the council embarked on a project nicknamed "For a Greener Curepipe" in collaboration with Gender Links Mauritius, in order to spur the growing environmental interest of Curepipe's citizens. Tree planting, backyard composting and food growing was encouraged, and a range of community organisations from schools to women's groups were involved.

Sensitization programmes are also underway in collaboration with the Central Water Authority of Mauritius, towards encouraging a more judicious management of the town's water resources.

Tourism

Curepipe, though inland from the main coastal tourist areas of Mauritius, is nonetheless a tourist destination. Some of the more popular attractions include:

 Curepipe Botanic Gardens
 Trou aux Cerfs Crater
 Monvert Nature Park
 Sainte Therese Church
 Carnegie Library of Curepipe
 The old Town Hall
 Domaine des Aubineaux
 The Basilica of Sainte Helene
 La Sabloniere
 Casino de Maurice	
 St. Joseph's College (National Heritage)	
 Royal College Curepipe (National Heritage)

Education

Curepipe is home to various secondary schools which include the Ambassador College, Floreal SSS,
Curepipe College, Dar-ul-Maarif Secondary School, Doha Secondary School, Dunputh Lallah SSS, Forest Side SSS Boys, Forest Side SSS Girls, Full Day School, Hindu Girls College, Imperial College, Loreto College Curepipe, Lycee Labourdonnais, Mauricia Institute, Mauritius College Boys, Mauritius College Girls, Notre Dame College, Ocep College, Presidency College Boys, Presidency College Girls, Renaissance College, St Patrick's College, Royal College Curepipe and St. Joseph's College.

Sports
The town is home to the Stade George V, the teams of the town are the Curepipe Starlight SC and the current champions Cercle de Joachim, they currently play in the National First Division for the 2015–2016 season.

Suburbs

The town of Curepipe is divided into different regions.

 Allée Brillant
 Résidence Atlee
 Couvent Lorette
 Curepipe Road
 Eau-Coulée
 Engrais-Cathan
 Engrais-Martial
 Floréal
 Forest-Side
 Malherbes
 Wooton
 Camp Caval
 Cité Joachim
 Cité St-Luc
 Cité Loyseau
 Mangalkhan
 Robinson 
 Les Casernes 
 Route du Jardin 
 La Brasserie 
 Camp Pierrot 
 Cité Anoska

Twin towns – sister cities
Curepipe is twinned with:
 Castel Gandolfo, Italy

See also

 List of places in Mauritius

References

 
Plaines Wilhems District
Moka District